In cryptography, the IDEA NXT algorithm (previously known as FOX) is a block cipher designed by Pascal Junod and Serge Vaudenay of EPFL (Lausanne, Switzerland). It was conceived between 2001 and 2003.  The project was originally named FOX and was published in 2003. In May 2005, it was announced by MediaCrypt under the name IDEA NXT. IDEA NXT is the successor to the International Data Encryption Algorithm (IDEA) and also uses the Lai–Massey scheme. MediaCrypt AG holds patents on elements of IDEA and IDEA NXT. The cipher is specified in two configurations: NXT64 (with block of 64 bits, key of 128 bits, 16 rounds) and NXT128 (with block of 128 bits, key of 256 bits, 16 rounds).

References

External links
 FOX Specifications Version 1.2
 256bit Ciphers - IDEANXT Reference implementation and derived code
 Mediacrypt homepage — IDEA licensor
 FOX: a new family of block ciphers
 FOX algorithm implementation - a hardware design approach
 BSD licensed C Software implementation of IDEA NXT
 U.S. Patent Application Pub. No. 2004/0247117
  U.S. Patent Application Pub. No. 2005/0053233

Block ciphers